Xiong Qiying (born 14 October 1967 in Sichuan Province) is a retired Chinese long jumper.

Her personal best jump was 7.03 metres, achieved in October 1997 in Shanghai, but the result was later annulled, as she was found to have been doping.

Doping 
In 1997 Xiong tested positive for a prohibited substance and was subsequently banned from sports by the Chinese Olympic Committee's anti-doping commission.

Achievements

References

1967 births
Living people
Chinese female long jumpers
Athletes (track and field) at the 1988 Summer Olympics
Olympic athletes of China
Asian Games medalists in athletics (track and field)
Athletes from Sichuan
Doping cases in athletics
Chinese sportspeople in doping cases
Athletes (track and field) at the 1990 Asian Games
Asian Games gold medalists for China
Medalists at the 1990 Asian Games
20th-century Chinese women